This is a list of schools in the Metropolitan Borough of Rotherham in the English county of South Yorkshire.

State-funded schools

Primary schools

 Anston Brook Primary School, North Anston
 Anston Greenlands Primary School, North Anston
 Anston Hillcrest Primary School, South Anston
 Anston Park Infant School, North Anston
 Anston Park Junior School, North Anston
 Aston All Saints CE Primary School, Aston
 Aston Fence Junior and Infant School, Woodhouse Mill
 Aston Hall Junior and Infant School, Aston
 Aston Lodge Primary School, Aston
 Aughton Junior Academy, Aughton
 Badsley Primary School, East Dene
 Blackburn Primary School, Blackburn
 Bramley Grange Primary School, Bramley
 Bramley Sunnyside Infant School, Bramley
 Bramley Sunnyside Junior School, Bramley
 Brampton Cortonwood Infant School, Brampton Bierlow
 Brampton Ellis CE Primary School, West Melton
 Brinsworth Howarth Primary School, Brinsworth
 Brinsworth Manor Infant School, Brinsworth
 Brinsworth Manor Junior School, Brinsworth
 Brinsworth Whitehill Primary School, Brinsworth
 Brookfield Primary Academy, Swinton
 Broom Valley Community School, Broom
 Canklow Woods Primary School, Canklow
 Catcliffe Primary School, Catcliffe
 Coleridge Primary, Eastwood
 Crags Community School, Maltby
 Dinnington Community Primary School, Dinnington
 East Dene Primary, East Dene
 Eastwood Village Primary School, Eastwood
 Ferham Primary School, Bradgate
 Flanderwell Primary School, Flanderwell
 Foljambe Primary School, Thrybergh
 Greasbrough Primary School, Greasbrough
 Harthill Primary School, Harthill
 Herringthorpe Infant School, Herringthorpe
 Herringthorpe Junior School, Herringthorpe
 Highfield Farm Primary School, West Melton
 High Greave Infant School, East Herringthorpe
 High Greave Junior School, East Herringthorpe
 Kilnhurst Primary School, Kilnhurst
 Kilnhurst St Thomas CE Primary Academy, Kilnhurst
 Kimberworth Community Primary School, Kimberworth
 Kiveton Park Infant School, Kiveton Park
 Kiveton Park Meadows Junior School, Kiveton Park
 Laughton All Saints CE Primary School, Laughton en le Morthen
 Laughton Junior and Infant School, Laughton en le Morthen
 Listerdale Junior Academy, Brecks
 Maltby Lilly Hall Academy, Maltby
 Maltby Manor Academy, Maltby
 Maltby Redwood Academy, Maltby
 Meadow View Primary School, Kimberworth
 Monkwood Primary Academy, Rawmarsh
 Our Lady and St Joseph's RC Primary School, Wath upon Dearne
 Ravenfield Primary Academy, Ravenfield
 Rawmarsh Ashwood Primary School, Parkgate
 Rawmarsh Rosehill Junior School, Rawmarsh
 Rawmarsh Ryecroft Infant School, Rawmarsh
 Rawmarsh Sandhill Primary School, Rawmarsh
 Rawmarsh Thorogate Junior and Infant School, Rawmarsh
 Redscope Primary School, Kimberwood
 Rockingham Junior and Infant School, Wingfield
 Roughwood Primary School, Kimberworth
 St Alban's CE Primary School, Wickersley
 St Ann's Primary School, Eastwood
 St Bede's RC Primary School, Kimberworth
 St Gerard's RC Primary School, Thrybergh
 St Joseph's RC Primary School, Dinnington
 St Joseph's RC Primary School, Rawmarsh
 St Mary's RC Primary School, Herringthorpe
 St Mary's RC Primary School, Maltby
 Sitwell Infant School, Broom
 Sitwell Junior School, Broom
 Springwood Junior Academy, Aston
 Swallownest Primary School, Swallownest
 Swinton Fitzwilliam Primary School, Swinton
 Swinton Queen Primary School, Swinton
 Thornhill Primary School, Bradgate
 Thorpe Hesley Primary School, Thorpe Hesley
 Thrybergh Fullerton CE Primary Academy, Thrybergh
 Thrybergh Primary School, Thrybergh
 Thurcroft Infant School, Thurcroft
 Thurcroft Junior Academy, Thurcroft
 Todwick Primary School, Todwick
 Treeton CE Primary School, Treeton
 Trinity Croft CE Primary Academy, Dalton Parva
 Wales Primary School, Wales
 Wath Central Primary School, Wath upon Dearne
 Wath CE Primary School, Wath upon Dearne
 Wath Victoria Primary School, Wath upon Dearne
 Waverley Junior Academy, Waverley
 Wentworth CE Junior and Infant School, Wentworth
 Whiston Junior and Infant School, Whiston
 Whiston Worrygoose Junior and Infant School, Whiston
 Wickersley Northfield Primary School, Wickersley
 Woodsetts Primary School, Woodsetts

Secondary schools

 Aston Academy, Swallownest
 Brinsworth Academy, Brinsworth
 Clifton Community School, Clifton
 Dinnington High School, Dinnington
 Maltby Academy, Maltby
 Oakwood High School, Canklow
 Rawmarsh Community School, Rawmarsh
 St Bernard's Catholic High School, Herringthorpe
 Saint Pius X Catholic High School, Wath upon Dearne
 Swinton Academy, Swinton
 Thrybergh Academy, Thrybergh
 Wales High School, Wales
 Wath Academy, Wath upon Dearne
 Wickersley School and Sports College, Wickersley
 Wingfield Academy, Wingfield
 Winterhill School, Kimberworth

Special and alternative schools

 Abbey School, Kimberworth
 Elements Academy, Dinnington
 Hilltop School, Maltby
 Kelford School, Kimberworth
 Milton School, Swinton
 Newman School, Whiston
 Rotherham Aspire, Rawmarsh
 The Rowan Centre, Rawmarsh
 The Willows School, Thurcroft

Further education
 Dearne Valley College
 Rotherham College of Arts and Technology
 Thomas Rotherham College

Independent schools

Special and alternative schools
 Abbeywood School, Hellaby
 Ellern Mede Moorgate School, Broom

Schools in Rotherham
Rotherham
Schools